Heraclides of Aenus was one of Plato's students. Around 360 BC, he and his brother Python assassinated Cotys I, the ruler of Thrace.

References

4th-century BC Greek people
4th-century BC philosophers
Academic philosophers
Ancient Thracian Greeks
Students of Plato